Rabbi Dayle A. Friedman is a pioneer in the development of a Jewish spiritual vision for aging, spiritual care and healing. She was the founding director of Hiddur: The Center for Aging and Judaism at the Reconstructionist Rabbinical College, which provided education, spiritual resources, and scholarship for elders and their caregivers.

She offers spiritual direction, spiritual accompaniment, help with decisions regarding medical choices and end of life, teaching, training and consulting through Growing Older, her Philadelphia-based, national practice. 

 She was ordained by the Hebrew Union College-Jewish Institute of Religion in 1985. From 1985 until 1997 she was the founding director of chaplaincy services at the Philadelphia Geriatric Center.

Selected works
 Jewish Wisdom for Growing Older: Finding Your Grit and Grace Beyond Midlife 
 Jewish Visions for Aging: A Professional Guide for Fostering Wholeness, with Eugene B. Borowitz and Thomas R. Cole 
 Jewish Pastoral Care: A Practical Handbook from Traditional and Contemporary Sources 
 Jewish End-of-Life Care in a Virtual Age: Our Traditions Reimagined https://www.amazon.com/dp/1734875062/ref=sr_1_3?dchild=1&keywords=dayle+friedman&qid=1609968194&s=books&sr=1-3

Awards and recognition
2008: Listed in 50 most influential American Jews compiled by The Forward 
2010: Listed in 50 most influential American women rabbis in The Forward, Sisterhood 
2010: Honorary Doctor of Divinity from the Hebrew Union College - Jewish Institute of Religion 
2010: Honorary Doctor of Divinity from the Reconstructionist Rabbinical College 
2011: Religion, Spirituality and Aging Award, American Society on Aging

References

Living people
Rabbis from Pennsylvania
American Reform rabbis
American Reconstructionist rabbis
Reconstructionist women rabbis
Reform women rabbis
Year of birth missing (living people)
Place of birth missing (living people)
21st-century American Jews